Plaza del Sol may refer to:

Plaza del Sol (Mexico), a shopping mall in Guadalajara, Jalisco, Mexico
Plaza del Sol (Puerto Rico), a shopping mall in Bayamon, Puerto Rico
Plaza del Sol (Florida), formerly Osceola Square Mall, a shopping mall in Kissimmee, Florida, US
Plaza del Sol (Gresham, Oregon), a landmark in Gresham, Oregon, US